A cannery tender was a type of commercial fishing vessel operated by salmon canneries in the early to mid- 20th century. Most commonly used in the Pacific Northwest and Alaska, cannery tenders transported fish from cannery-owned fish traps to canneries. Cannery tenders also transported men and supplies to set up and maintain the fish traps and patrolled the area around fish traps to protect them from fish pirates.

After commercial fish traps were banned in Washington in 1934 and in Alaska in 1959, many of the cannery tenders were sold to private operators for use as fishing boats or towing vessels.

Surviving examples

 was one of two identical cannery tenders operated by Fidalgo Island Packing Company. Chacon can be visited at her permanent location in Chugiak, Alaska.

References

External links
 The Days of Salmon Traps & Fish Pirates (video)

 
Commercial fishing in Alaska
Fishing in the United States
Salmon
Ship types